Martinus "Tinus" Bernardus Osendarp (21 May 1916 – 20 June 2002) was a Dutch sprint runner.

Sporting career
Osendarp was a football player and started training in sprint for fun. His first international success came at the 1934 European Championships where he won bronze medals in the 200 m and 4 × 100 m relay. He won another two bronze medals at the 1936 Summer Olympics in Berlin, in the 100 m and 200 m sprint events. The games were held in Nazi Germany and Osendarp gained some fame as the fastest white sprinter behind the black Americans. A possible third medal was lost when Osendarp dropped the baton in the final of the 4 × 100 m relay while fighting for second place. Contested on the second day of the games, drenching rain made the track soggy and slow for the running of the 100 meter dash semi-finals.  Despite the unfavorable conditions Osendarp still managed a time of 10.6 s, right behind American Ralph Metcalfe. In the 100 m final he ran 10.5 s, behind Americans Jesse Owens 10.3 s, and Ralph Metcalfe 10.4 s. Upon his return home Osendarp was called "the best white sprinter" by the Dutch press.

The basis for his future involvement in National Socialism was laid in Berlin, where he first came under the influence of SS propaganda.

In 1938 Osendarp won two European titles in the 100 m and 200 m, equalling the 1934 performance of his compatriot Chris Berger.

Later life
When Germany occupied the Netherlands in World War II, Osendarp, who was by then a Dutch police officer, became a member of the German Security Service. He later joined the Dutch national socialist NSB party and the SS. When the Wehrmacht marched into Holland in 1940 Osendarp became a member of the volunteer SS and an employee of the Nazi Security Police, helping in the deportation of Dutch Jews.

In 1948, Osendarp was sentenced for 12 years in jail for acts he committed during the war. He was released early in 1953 and moved to Limburg to work in the mines. In 1958 he also became athletics coach at Kimbria in Maastricht, and from 1972 he was a coach at Achilles-Top in Kerkrade. He died in 2002 at the age of 86 in Heerlen.

Competition record

References 

1916 births
2002 deaths
Dutch male sprinters
Athletes (track and field) at the 1936 Summer Olympics
Dutch collaborators with Nazi Germany
Dutch police officers
European Athletics Championships medalists
Olympic athletes of the Netherlands
Olympic bronze medalists for the Netherlands
Sportspeople from Heerlen
Sportspeople from Delft
SS personnel
Medalists at the 1936 Summer Olympics
Olympic bronze medalists in athletics (track and field)
Dutch prisoners and detainees